Dominika Grabowska (born 26 December 1998) is a Polish football midfielder, currently playing for
FC Fleury 91 and the Polish national team.

International goals

External links 
 

1998 births
Living people
Polish women's footballers
Poland women's international footballers
Górnik Łęczna (women) players
Place of birth missing (living people)
Women's association football midfielders
FC Fleury 91 (women) players
Expatriate women's footballers in France
Polish expatriate sportspeople in France
Division 1 Féminine players